Elgin Street, located in Bacup, Lancashire, is one of the shortest streets in the world at . It held the British record until November 2006, when it was discovered that Ebenezer Place, Wick in Caithness, Scotland, which was constructed in 1883 and named in 1887, was shorter at only  in length.

The street is accessed from a walkway between Bank Street and Lord Street, but vehicular access has been cut off by the later construction of this walkway and steps. The street can be viewed from the railings above.

References 

Borough of Rossendale
Streets in England